Baudouin de Ligne, 12th Prince of Ligne, GE (Baudouin Marie Lamoral de Ligne, Prince de Ligne et du Saint-Empire, Prince d'Amblise et d'Epinoy, Grand d'Espagne; 1918–1985) was the head of the princely House of Ligne.

Prince Baudouin was the elder son of Eugène II, 11th prince de Ligne, and his wife, Philippine de Noailles. He had a younger brother, Antoine, and two sisters (Isabelle and Yolande).

Upon the death of his father, he became the head of one of the most prestigious Belgian noble families. Following his death in 1985 without descent, his brother Antoine succeeded him as 13th Prince of Ligne and of the Holy Roman Empire.

Ancestry

References 
 Princes of Ligne

1918 births
1985 deaths
12
12